Aaron Rouge-Serret (born January 1988) is an Australian former athlete who competed as a sprinter.

Raised in Melbourne, Rouge-Serret is the son of a Mauritian-born butcher and attended Caulfield Grammar School. In 2005 he was the Australian All Schools Champion in both the 100 and 200 metre sprints.

Rouge-Serret, who had a personal best in the 100 metres of 10.17 seconds, was coached by Neville Sillitoe.

In 2010, Rouge-Serret came fifth in the 100 metres final at the Commonwealth Games in Delhi and was seventh in the 100 metres at the IAAF Continental Cup in Split, Croatia.

Rouge-Serret represented Australia in three editions of the World Athletics Championships.

References

External links
Aaron Rouge-Serret at World Athletics

1988 births
Living people
Australian male sprinters
Athletes from Melbourne
Australian people of Mauritian descent
People educated at Caulfield Grammar School
World Athletics Championships athletes for Australia
Athletes (track and field) at the 2010 Commonwealth Games
Commonwealth Games competitors for Australia